Dame Harriette Joanna Vine DBE OStJ (6 April 1878 – 1962) was a New Zealand lawyer. She was the first woman to graduate with a degree in law from Victoria University of Wellington. She received a number of awards for her work with the Order of St John.

Early life 
Vine was born in Dunedin on 6 April 1878. Her parents were English immigrants Edward and Sarah Vine. She attended Anderson's Bay School, and Otago Girl's High School. The family moved to Whanganui, in New Zealand's North Island, and she passed the university matriculation examination in 1904.

Vine studied law at Victoria University of Wellington, graduating in 1913 with a bachelor of law and in 1915 with a master of law. She was the first woman to graduate in law from the university.

Career 
After graduating, Vine returned to Whanganui and worked as a lawyer in the firm Treadwell and Gordon, specialising in banking, trust, wills and company work. She remained with the firm for 47 years.

Vine was active in the Order of St. John and in 1930 she was made an Officer of the Order of St John. She was also made a Dame of the British Empire for this work.

Vine died when she was hit by a train while walking home from work. She was 84 years old.

Legacy 
Vine left her home to the Whanganui District Council in her will; the Harriette Vine Free Kindergarten was built on the land.

In 2014, the Wellington Women Lawyers Association commemorated the centenary of Vine's graduation from the university with an essay competition titled "Harriette’s challenges 100 years on: same or different?”. The Victoria University of Wellington Law Review published the two winning entries in a special issue on women in law.

See also 
 First women lawyers around the world

References 

1878 births
1962 deaths
People educated at Otago Girls' High School
New Zealand women lawyers
20th-century New Zealand lawyers
Lawyers from Dunedin
Victoria University of Wellington alumni
Officers of the Order of St John
20th-century women lawyers